Lwamata is a town in Ssingo County, Kiboga District, in the Central Region of Uganda.

Location
The geographical coordinates of Lwamata are 0°53'15.0"N, 31°49'09.0"E (Latitude:0.887494; Longitude:31.819173).

Overview
Lwamata was one of the areas where the National Resistance Army guerrillas initiated their early recruitment campaigns. A war memorial was elected in the town, to commemorate the lives that were lost.

See also
 Kiboga
 Bukomero
 Kiboga District

References

External links

Populated places in Central Region, Uganda
Cities in the Great Rift Valley
Kiboga District